The 2018 Quick Lane Bowl was a college football bowl game played on December 26, 2018, at Ford Field in Detroit. It was the fifth edition of the Quick Lane Bowl, and one of the 2018–19 bowl games concluding the 2018 FBS football season. The game was sponsored by Quick Lane tire and auto centers.

Teams
The game was contested between Minnesota from the Big Ten Conference and Georgia Tech from the Atlantic Coast Conference (ACC). This was the first meeting between these teams.

Minnesota Golden Gophers

Minnesota received and accepted a bid to the Quick Lane Bowl on December 2. The Golden Gophers entered the bowl with a 6–6 record (3–6 in conference).

Georgia Tech Yellow Jackets

Georgia Tech received and accepted a bid to the Quick Lane Bowl on December 2. The Yellow Jackets entered the bowl with a 7–5 record (5–3 in conference). In the weeks prior to the game, head coach Paul Johnson announced that this would be his last game coaching.

Game summary

Scoring summary

Statistics

References

External links
 Box score at ESPN
 Photo album at detroitlions.com

Quick Lane Bowl
Quick Lane Bowl
Quick Lane Bowl
Quick Lane Bowl
Georgia Tech Yellow Jackets football bowl games
Minnesota Golden Gophers football bowl games